Steven Kuhn is a philosophy professor at Georgetown University whose research focuses on logic, ethics and the philosophy of language.

Early life, family and education

Kuhn earned his undergraduate degree in mathematics from Johns Hopkins University and his Ph.D. from Stanford University.

Career
Prior to his position at Georgetown, he taught at the University of Michigan, UCLA and the University of Pennsylvania. 

Kuhn is the author of the two-volume Many-sorted Modal Logics (1977) and contributed the article on the prisoner's dilemma to the Stanford Encyclopedia of Philosophy.

References

External links 
 Steven Kuhn faculty page at Georgetown University
 

American logicians
Living people
Georgetown University faculty
University of Michigan faculty
Year of birth missing (living people)
Johns Hopkins University alumni
Stanford University alumni